The Le Sueur County Courthouse and Jail are government buildings in Le Center, Minnesota, United States. They were added to the National Register of Historic Places in 1981.  The 1896 courthouse and 1914 jail were nominated to the Register for being local landmarks representative of Le Sueur County's government and the origin of Le Center as a purpose-built county seat.

References

External links
 Building Location Details: Le Sueur County Courthouse

Buildings and structures in Le Sueur County, Minnesota
County courthouses in Minnesota
County government buildings in Minnesota
Courthouses on the National Register of Historic Places in Minnesota
Government buildings completed in 1896
Government buildings completed in 1914
Jails on the National Register of Historic Places in Minnesota
Richardsonian Romanesque architecture in Minnesota
National Register of Historic Places in Le Sueur County, Minnesota
Jails in Minnesota